In mathematics, the Newton inequalities are named after Isaac Newton.  Suppose a1, a2, ..., an are real numbers and let  denote the kth elementary symmetric polynomial in a1, a2, ..., an.  Then the elementary symmetric means, given by

satisfy the inequality

If all the numbers ai are non-zero, then equality holds if and only if all the numbers ai are equal. 

It can be seen that S1 is the arithmetic mean, and Sn is the n-th power of the geometric mean.

See also

 Maclaurin's inequality

References

D.S. Bernstein Matrix Mathematics: Theory, Facts, and Formulas (2009 Princeton) p. 55

Isaac Newton
Inequalities
Symmetric functions